The College of Health Sciences of the Kwame Nkrumah University of Science and Technology comprises the Faculties of Allied Health Sciences, Pharmacy and Pharmaceutical Sciences, School of Medical Sciences, School of Dentistry, School of Veterinary Medicine and the Kumasi Centre for Collaborative Research in tropical medicine (KCCR). It attained the status of a college by a change in the University Statutes that came into being in January 2005. Prior to this time, the components of the college existed separately as the Faculty of Pharmacy and School of Medical Sciences.

Provost's Office 
 Provost - Professor Christian Agyare
 Registrar - H.H Akosah
 College Accountant - Johnson Owusu
 College Librarian - Victor Teye
 Assistant Registrar - Ida Saeed
 Administrative Assistant -Nana Yeboah

Faculties & Departments 
Source:

Faculty of Allied Health Sciences 
The Allied Health Faculty consist of:
 Department of Medical Laboratory Technology
 Department of Nursing
 Department of Sports and Exercise Science
 Department of Sonography

Faculty of Pharmacy and Pharmaceutical Sciences 
 Department of Clinical and Social Pharmacy
 Department of Herbal Medicine
 Department of Pharmaceutical Chemistry
 Department of Pharmaceutics
 Department of Pharmacognosy 		
 Department of Pharmacology

School of Medicine and Dentistry 
The School of Medicine and Dentistry was created to train Physicians, Medical Scientists and Medical Laboratory Technologists. Students enrolled take a 3-year course upon successful completion they are awarded a BSc in Human Biology. An additional 3-year program continues for the MBCHB or the BDS. At present, the School concentrates on training Physicians at the undergraduate level, and Medical Scientists at the postgraduate levels. The School is involved in the training of postgraduate doctors for the professional membership and fellowship certification of the Ghana College of Physicians and Surgeons and the West African Postgraduate Medical College

The Medical School consist of the following:
 Anesthesiology and Intensive Care
 Department of Anatomy
 Department of Behavioural Sciences
 Department of Child Health
 Department of Clinical Microbiology
 Department of Community Health
 Department of EENT
 Department of Medicine
 Department of Molecular Medicine
 Department of Obstetrics and Gynaecology
 Department of Pathology
 Department of Physiology
 Department of Radiology
 Department of Surgery

School of Veterinary Medicine 
The School of Veterinary Medicine, was also establishment in 2009. It consist of:
 Veterinary Anatomy and Physiology
 Veterinary Pathology
 Veterinary Pharmacology and Toxicology
 Veterinary Public Health, Food Hygiene and Food Safety
 Veterinary Clinical Studies

Research
 Kumasi Centre for Collaborative Research into Tropical Medicine

References 

Dental schools
Kwame Nkrumah University of Science and Technology
Medical schools in Ghana